Raffaele Costa (born 8 September 1936 in Mondovì) is an Italian politician. He was the  President of the Province of Cuneo, from June 2004 to June 2009. He was previously a member of the Italian Chamber of Deputies representing the Italian Liberal Party and later Forza Italia, between 1976 and 2003, and was also a Member of the European Parliament of the European People's Party until June 2004.

His son Enrico is also a politician - he was Minister of Regional Affairs in the Renzi Cabinet and the Gentiloni Cabinet.

Education
Costa holds a degree in Law and Political Science.

Parliamentary career
He was elected to the Italian Chamber of Deputies in 1976, 1979, 1983, 1987, 1992, 1994, 1996 and 2001.

As Minister
He was Minister without Portfolio for the co-ordination of community political and regional affairs (1992), Minister of Health (1993), Minister of Transport and Minister of the Merchant Marine in the Ciampi government.

As Under-Secretary of State
Costa was parliamentary under-secretary of state in the:
Ministry of Justice
Ministry of Foreign Affairs (8th Legislature)
Ministry of the Interior (Craxi Government)
Ministry of Public Works (9th Legislature)

In the European Parliament
 Member of the European Parliament's former Committee on the Atmosphere
 Member of European Parliament's Committee on Budgetary Control
 Member of European Parliament's Committee on the Environment, Public Health and Food Safety 
 Member of European Parliament's Committee on Internal Market and Consumer Protection

Other appointments
 Chairman of the Defence Committee of the Chamber of Deputies
 Vice-Chairman of the Agriculture and Forestry Committee of the Chamber of Deputies (1976–1979)
 General Secretary of the Italian Liberal Party (1993–1994)
 Chairman of the Liberal Democratic Federalist parliamentary group (1995–1996)
 Administrator of Forza Italia's Office for Citizens' Rights
 President of the Province of Cuneo (2004–2009)

Author
Costa has written four books:
The Doctor is Outside the Room
My First Republic
Italy, Land of Waste
Italy, Land of Privilege

Publisher
He founded and published the periodical Il Duemila in 1971.

See also
 2004 European Parliament election in Italy

External links
   

1936 births
Living people
People from Mondovì
Italian Liberal Party politicians
Forza Italia MEPs
MEPs for Italy 1999–2004
Transport ministers of Italy
Italian Ministers of Health